"Nine Million Bicycles" is a song written and produced by Mike Batt for the singer Katie Melua's second album, Piece by Piece. It was released as the album's first single in September 2005 and reached number five on the UK Singles Chart, becoming Melua's first top five hit as a solo artist. It was a finalist for The Record of the Year prize, losing to "You Raise Me Up" by Westlife.

Background
According to Melua, the inspiration for the song came during a visit to Beijing with her manager Mike Batt. Their interpreter showed them around the city and told them that there are supposedly nine million bicycles in the city. Batt wrote a song based around the title "Nine Million Bicycles" after returning to England two weeks later, and it was one of the last songs to be recorded for Piece by Piece. Adrian Brett, who played the ethnic flutes on Batt's album Caravans (1978), contributed to the song; an ocarina was used for the low sounds, and a Chinese bamboo flute for the high sounds.

Melua said that she liked the song "because it is a simple juxtaposition of a trivial idea ('Nine Million Bicycles') against an important idea ('I will love you till I die')". The website indieLondon named it one of the "highlights" of Piece by Piece, describing it as "genuinely sweet ... The meandering blasts of flute that weave their way throughout lend the song a Chinese feel and make it quite enticing".

The single's music video, directed by Kevin Godley, shows Melua being dragged across the floor through a variety of settings, including a brief shot of the Summer Palace in Beijing, until she returns to a picnic in a park with her friends.

Alternative version
In 2005, Melua was criticised by writer and scientist Simon Singh for inaccurate lyrics referring to the size of the observable universe ("We are 12 billion light-years from the edge. That's a guess — no one can ever say it's true"). Melua and Singh met, and Melua re-recorded a tongue-in-cheek version of the song for BBC Radio 4's Today program that had been written by Singh:

"We are 13.7 billion light-years from the edge of the observable universe; that's a good estimate with well-defined error bars/and with the available information, I predict that I will always be with you".

Melua later said that she 'should have known better' as she used to be a member of the Astronomy club at school.

Track listing
 "Nine Million Bicycles" (Mike Batt) – 3:15
 "Market Day in Guernica" (Batt) – 4:02
 "Stardust" (Hoagy Carmichael, Mitchell Parish) – 4:10

Personnel
 Katie Melua – vocals, guitar
 Dominic Glover – trumpet
 Adrian Brett – flute
 Mike Batt – piano
 Jim Cregan – guitar
 Chris Spedding – guitar
 Mike Darcy – violin
 Tim Harries – bass guitar
 Henry Spinetti – drums
 Martin Ditchman – percussion
 Chris Karan – percussion
 The Irish Film Orchestra

Production
 Mike Batt – producer, arranged
 Steve Sale – engineer

Charts

Weekly charts

Year-end charts

Certifications

References

Katie Melua songs
2005 singles
Music videos directed by Kevin Godley
Songs written by Mike Batt
Songs about China
Song recordings produced by Mike Batt